Sandhya may refer to:

Hinduism
 Another name of Saranyu, goddess of clouds

List of people with the given name Sandhya
B. Sandhya (born 1963), Inspector General of Kerala Police in India
Sandhya Agarwal (born 1963), former captain of the Indian women's cricket team
Sandhya Dwarkadas, Indian computer scientist
Sandhya Mazumdar, Indian test cricketer
Sandhya Menon, American young adult fiction author
Sandhya Mukhopadhyay (born 1931), Indian singer and musician specializing in Bengali music
Sandhya Sanjana, Indian jazz/funk/rock singer
Sandhya Shantaram, Indian actress of the 1950s, wife of V. Shantaram
Sandhya (actress) (born 1988), Indian actress in Tamil, Malayalam, Telugu and Kannada films, active 2004-present
Sandhya Mridul (born 1975), Indian actress in Bollywood films, active 1993-present
Sandhya Roy, actress in the Bengali language film industry, active 60s, 70s, and 80s
Sandhya Kumari, Sri Lankan actress, active 1963–1977

Historic
Sandhya, a 13th century ruler from Kamarupa kingdom

Artistic works
Sandhya Bhraman, a short story collection by Bhabendra Nath Saikia
 Sandhya (album), a 2001 album by Zubeen Garg
 Sandhya (film), 1969 Malayalam language film

Other uses
Twilight language (sāṃdhyābhāṣā), the polysemic language of ancient scriptures 

Indian feminine given names